Newbiggin-by-the-Sea railway station, also referred to as Newbiggin station, served the town of Newbiggin-by-the-Sea, Northumberland, England from 1872 to 1964 on the Blyth and Tyne Railway.

History 
The station opened as Newbiggin on 1 March 1872 as a terminus of the Blyth and Tyne Railway.

It was situated on the west side of Front Street (now the B1334) and north of what is now the junction with the Buteland Terrace. 

The station had a long island platform onto which the station building faced. There were sidings on both sides of the station which handled a variety of goods traffic, mainly potatoes and livestock, it was equipped with a one-ton crane. There was a signal box and a turntable.

A camping coach was positioned here by the North Eastern Region from 1959 to 1964.

The station closed to both passengers and goods traffic on 2 November 1964.

References

External links 

Disused railway stations in Northumberland
Former North Eastern Railway (UK) stations
Railway stations in Great Britain opened in 1872
Railway stations in Great Britain closed in 1964
1872 establishments in England
1964 disestablishments in England
Beeching closures in England
Newbiggin-by-the-Sea